Yannik Möker (born 27 July 1999) is a German footballer who plays as a midfielder for  club FSV Zwickau.

Early life
Möker was born in Wolfenbüttel.

Club career
After playing youth football with TSV Gielde, Eintracht Braunschweig and VfL Wolfsburg, and senior football with VfL Wolfsburg II where he made 51 appearances and scored 9 goals, he signed for FSV Zwickau on a one-year contract in August 2020. He made his debut for FSV Zwickau on 17 October 2020 in a 2–1 3. Liga defeat to KFC Uerdingen 05.

International career
He was capped once by Germany at under-18 level.

References

1999 births
Living people
German footballers
Association football midfielders
VfL Wolfsburg II players
FSV Zwickau players
Regionalliga players
3. Liga players
Germany youth international footballers
People from Wolfenbüttel
Footballers from Lower Saxony